Watson Hill is a summit in Plymouth County, Massachusetts.

Watson Hill has the name of Elkanah Watson, a pioneer who owned the site in the 1680s.

References

Landforms of Plymouth County, Massachusetts
Hills of Massachusetts